Kathleen Fee (born in Montreal, Quebec) is a Canadian actress, writer, voice actress, writer and director.

Filmography

Films

Television

Video games

References

External links 
 
 
 Kathleen Fee on glenntalent.ca

Actresses from Montreal
Canadian voice actresses
Canadian film actresses
Canadian television actresses
Canadian stage actresses
Canadian translators
Canadian voice directors
Living people
Year of birth missing (living people)
Canadian video game actresses